The 1927–28 Danmarksmesterskabsturneringen i Fodbold was the 1st edition of the new year-long league structure for the Danish national football championship play-offs, a Danish FA-organised club football tournament between the highest ranking clubs from each of the six regional football associations. The national tournament at the top of the Danish football league system consisted of two stages, a preliminary round contested by 20 teams split into 5 groups determined by draw and distributed evenly among all regional associations, where the five winners of each group would qualify for the final championship round held at the end of the season. The clubs participating in the nationwide competition were also simultaneously contesting in their local regional league championships.

The preliminary group stage began on 28 August 1927 with four matches at Horsens, Odense, Korsør and Rønne, and ended on 15 April 1928, while the final championship group stage was played between 4 May and 13 June 1928. No clubs from the five provincial football association qualified for the final phase of the tournament, which only involved clubs from Copenhagen. Boldklubben af 1893 were the defending Danish national champions. Three teams, B.93, B 1903 and BK Frem, ended up with the same number of points in the final group stage. Although B.93 had the best goal difference, the rules for this season did not include situations in case of ties on points. The Danish FA dictated that rematches between the top three teams should be played, but B.93 and BK Frem did not want to participate, while B 1903 were not interested in winning the championship without playing an actual rematch. This was the first year of the national tournament and the Danish FA had not taken this specific situation into account, and the tournament was therefore declared without a winner.

Season summary

A nationwide tournament was established as a replacement for the Sylow-Tournament and the Danish national football championship play-off structure, known as the Landsfodboldturneringen that had existed between 1913 and 1927. The intention behind the establishment of the new national season-long league tournament was to help increase the level of play in the provincial football clubs to that of the leading clubs based in Copenhagen by having the leading clubs in the entire country play against each other. Compared to Danish football, Swedish football have had an established national league for several years, which had raised the level of football play for even smaller cities. The Danish FA determined, that structure of the tournament would initially consist of 20 teams distributed in five groups, where each team played each other one time either at home or away — each team was secured at least one match in their home town. The participants in each group were determined by draw, and distributed evenly among all the regional associations. The Fredericia Social-Demokrat argued that the Copenhagen-based clubs would likely feature their best players in the match line-ups in the preliminary round, rather than squads packed with reserve players, giving that all clubs needed to qualify for the championship round on equal terms. Qualifying to the next season's Danish championship tournament would also stimulate the clubs to work harder in the six regional championship leagues so they would finish in the top spots.

The first goal of the season, and the first goal in the new tournament, was netted after 5 minutes of play by a reserve player, centre forward Oluf "Ole" Petersen of Korsør BK, who played at their home ground in Korsør, known as Banen ved Taarnborgvej, against the reigning Danish football champions, B.93, on 28 August 1927. The first match day also saw the largest victory of the season and the largest number of goals made by one player in the same match, when B 1903 won 11–0 in their away game against Rønne BK on 28 August 1927, with three goals being scored in the first half and another eight in the second half, in front of a record crowd of 1,100 spectators at the Østergadebanen field in Rønne. The centre-forward Aksel ("Axel") Hansen, who had just recently been promoted the club's first team squad featuring several Danish national team players, scored 8 goals, which contributed greatly to him securing the tournament's topscorer title. Viborg FF's left half back and captain, Hermann Brügmann, was credited with scoring the first own goal of the tournament, in his side's 1–8 away loss to Horsens FS on 4 September 1927, when an attempt of a pass back to Viborg FF goalkeeper Aksel Laursen in the 23rd minute of the game failed completely.

Different news outlets made the claim that the players of BK Fremad Amager lost their away match i Viborg on 18 September 1927 against Viborg FF due intoxication before the match. The Copenhagen team fielded their strongest line-up, but only had three shots on target, and did not impress the media present at the match. The accusations were dismissed as unfounded and unjustified by the Danish FA after an investigation.

The first senior tournament match for Carl "Skoma'r" Hansen after his return to his former status as an amateur football player in Danish competitive football, following a 2-year mandatory suspension period for having signed a professional contract with the Scottish side Rangers F.C. (1921–1925) as the first Danish professional player abroad, was originally scheduled for the KBU league match against Kjøbenhavns BK on 23 October 1927, but the match was cancelled 20 minutes before the start due to the severe weather conditions of rain and storm. Hansen instead participated in an away match in Nykøbing Falster against B 1901 on 6 November 1927 as part of the Danish championship this season.

The match schedule for the tournament's spring season was published on 3 January 1928 by the Danish FA. At the start of the spring season, Kjøbenhavns BK had already outplayed their possibilities of advancement in the tournament by losing to Horsens FS and BK Fremad Amager, while the three other teams could still win the group — Horsens FS (4 points), Viborg FF (2 points), BK Fremad Amager (2 points) and Kjøbenhavns BK (0 points). Two matches in group 1 remained: Kjøbenhavns BK vs. Viborg FF and BK Fremad Amager vs Horsens FS. The rules of the tournament stated, that if three teams would end up with the exact number of points, the team with the best goal average would win the group — Horsens FS had the best options at that point in time due to a better goal average. If only two teams had obtained the same number of points, the team, who had been declared the winner in the teams' football match, would win the group.

The first championship replay match between B 1903 and BK Frem were originally scheduled to take place on 27 June 1928. At a meeting in the evening on 25 June, BK Frem decided to inform the Danish FA, that they would not participate in the first replay match. B 1903 had arranged private matches as part of their 25 years anniversary and did not want to participate in additional games for the Danish league championship. At the same time, the players of the first team of B.93 informed the club's board, that they would not be able to play due to several injuries — the goalkeeper Fritz Tarp had gotten a ruptured muscle at their last match in Fredrikstad — during their tour in Norway. The Danish FA decided to cancel the championship tournament resulting in no winner being announced this season, as both B.93, B 1903 and BK Frem had the same number of points in the championship round.

In late March 2020, B.93 requested the Danish FA to be acknowledged as winners, as they had the best goal score, goal ratio, and had the best internal match score compared to the two other title contenders with six points, BK Frem and B 1903. The request was denied on 1 May 2020 on the basis on the era's different set of rules and that the Danish FA had already at that time made a definite decision.

Qualified teams

With a capacity of more than 15,000 spectators, Københavns Idrætspark was the biggest stadium of the football tournament, and it was the only stadium in use in the championship round. Together with the stadiums at Nykøbing Falster and Rønne, it had partly covered stands, limited seating arrangements and somewhat terraced pitches and fences surrounding the ground. The football fields in Klampenborg, Haslev, Sakskøbing and Odense were left without such features.

Preliminary round

1. Kreds table

1. Kreds results

2. Kreds table

2. Kreds results

3. Kreds table

3. Kreds results

4. Kreds table

4. Kreds results

5. Kreds table

5. Kreds results

Championship round

Championship table

Championship results

Season statistics

Scoring

Goal scorers

Hat-tricks

Clean sheets

Attendance

References

Top level Danish football league seasons
1927–28 in Danish football
Denmark